The 2015 Guildford Borough Council election took place on 7 May 2015 to elect members of Guildford Borough Council in England as one of the 2015 local elections, held simultaneously with the General Election.

Results
The result saw the Conservatives win 35 of the 48 seats on Guildford Borough Council, one more than the 34 seat which they won in the previous elections in 2011.

Towards the north and east of the Borough of Guildford, a new party the Guildford Greenbelt Group won three seats, two in Send ward and one in Clandon & Horsley ward. All three of these gains were from the Conservatives.  Also in the north and east of the Borough of Guildford, the Liberal Democrats retained their 2014 by-election gain, which they had made from the Conservatives, in Lovelace ward.

Moving from the east and north east of the borough to the town of Guildford itself, the Conservatives made five gains.  They gained one of the three Liberal Democrat seats on Friary & St Nicolas ward, plus one of the three Liberal Democrat seats on Stoughton ward, plus the Liberal Democrat seat on Stoke ward.  They also gained two of the three seats on Westborough ward, taking one from the Liberal Democrats and one from Labour.

The summary table below shows changes relative to the 2011 Guildford Borough Council election results.  It does not take account of the interim by-election change in Lovelace ward.

Voting trends
This article compares the votes obtained in the 2015 election with those obtained in 2011.  The percentages obtained per candidate can be found in the full list of ward by ward results further down this page.  The source and methodology for calculating percentages are discussed in the reference notes at the foot of the page.

The 2015 Guildford Borough Council election coincided with the United Kingdom general election.  This resulted in a significantly increased turnout.

The wards to the west of Guildford town saw the Conservatives win every single seat, by a comfortable margin.  In five of the six rural wards to the west of Guildford where there was both a Liberal Democrat candidate and a Guildford Greenbelt Group candidate, it was the Greenbelt candidate, rather than the Liberal Democrat, who was the runner up to the Conservatives.

The voting behaviour in the town of Guildford itself was different from the rural areas.  In a clear majority of the rural wards the top two parties were the Conservatives and the Guildford Greenbelt Group.  By contrast in the town of Guildford itself, the Greenbelt Group were not in the top two in any of the wards.

The west side of the town had a number of wards where the total number of votes cast for Conservative candidates in that ward and cast for Liberal Democrats in that ward were nearly equal.  The closest was in Stoughton which had a total combined vote for Conservative candidates of 4421, versus 4424 for the Liberal Democrats.  In Friary & St Nicolas ward, the total combined vote for the three Conservative candidates was 4265.  The total combined vote for the three Liberal Democrat candidates was 4254.

In the east side of the town, other than Stoke ward, the Conservative won comfortably in all the wards, with the Liberal Democrats a distant second.

The Labour percentage vote in the town of Guildford itself, if one considers the wards as a whole, was up.  However the Labour vote was down in percentage terms in those wards which had a Labour councillor going into the election.

The most dramatic voting change occurred in the eastern rural wards.  Traditionally these have contained the Conservative's safest seats.  In 2011, the Conservatives won all six of the council seats in Clandon & Horlsey ward, Lovelace ward and Send ward towards the east and north east of the Borough.  In 2015, the Conservative only retained two of those six seats; losing three seats to the Guildford Greenbelt Group and seeing the Liberal Democrats retain their 2014 by election gain in Lovelace ward.  The long-term future of the Wisley Airfield site, in Lovelace ward, was one of the issues particular to this part of Guildford Borough.

Ash

Ash South & Tongham
Ash is to the west of Guildford Borough Council and borders Aldershot further to its west.  Ash South and Tongham ward is the southerly one of the three Ash wards.  It elects three councillors.

The 2011 elections had seen three Conservative candidates face only 2 Labour candidates and no one else.  As a results the three Conservatives had been returned very easily with each candidate getting around 80% of the vote.  The 2015 elections were more competitive.  Three Conservatives, two Liberal Democrats, one Labour and one Guildford Greenbelt candidate stood for this ward.  The three Conservatives won between 63% and 69% of the vote.  Two new councillors for the area, Nigel Kearse and Paul Spooner, were amongst those elected.  The two Liberal Democrat, one Labour and one Guildford Green Belt candidates each obtained votes in the 20% to 30% region.

Ash Vale
Ash Vale is the northerly of the three Ash wards.  It elects two councillors.

The Liberal Democrats had not put up candidates in either the Ash South & Tongham ward or the Ash Vale ward in the 2011 elections.  In 2015 two Liberal Democrats and two Conservatives competed in this ward.  The Conservatives won.

There was a noticeable difference between the vote of the top Conservative candidate (71%) and that of the second candidate (60%).  By contrast the two Liberal Democrat candidates, in Ash Vale ward, were only 2 vote apart from one another.

Ash Wharf
Ash Wharf is the central of the three Ash wards.  It elects two candidates.

In both the 2011 elections and the 2015 elections, four years later, the top Conservative candidate, in Ash Wharf, obtained 63.3% of the vote.

West Rural Guildford

Normandy
Normandy elects one councillor.  It is the ward between Guildford (the town) and Ash.

The Conservatives held Normandy ward, in 2015, with a majority of 644 over the second placed Guildford Greenbelt candidate.  The Liberal Democrats fell back to fourth, behind the Labour candidate.  The Liberal Democrats only obtaining around 7% of the vote in a seat they (and their SDP-Liberal Alliance predecessors) had held between 1987 and 1999.  New councillor for the area David Bilbe was elected.

Pilgrims
Pilgrims ward covers a number of small villages along the North Downs.  It elects one councillor.

Conservative Tony Rooth was re-elected with 61.9% of the vote, with the Guildford Greenbelt candidate, on 14.6%, in second place.

Pirbright
Pirbright elects one councillor.

The previous three contests in Pirbright have been straight Conservative versus Liberal Democrat fights.  This time in addition to Conservative and Liberal Democrat candidates, there was a Guildford Greenbelt candidate.

The Conservative share of the vote has remained within a fairly consistent range, in Pirbright, over the last decade.  It was roughly 66% in 2007, 64% in a by election in 2010 and 71% in 2011.  In 2015, it was 66%.  Existing councillor, Gordon Jackson, was re-elected.

Shalford
Shalford borders Guildford town to its south west.  It elects two councillors.  The ward includes Artington and Compton as well as Shalford.

Shalford was one of a number of wards in Guildford where the Conservatives retained the seat in 2015, but with new candidates.  Michael Illman and Michael Parsons were elected with a majority that fell slightly from the Conservatives 2011 majority of 746,  to 669.  The runner up was the Guildford Greenbelt Group.

Worplesdon
Worplesdon ward borders the town to the north and north west of Guildford.  It elects three councillors.  It includes a substantial amount of town overspill in addition to villages like Worplesdon and Wood Street village.

The Conservatives retained their three seats in Worplesdon ward.  Their majority increased slightly from 399, in 2011, to 426 in 2015.  Existing councillors for the area David Elms, Bob McShee and Iseult Roche were re-elected.  The Guildford Greenbelt Group were the runners up.  The Liberal Democrat vote fell to around 15% (in 2011 it had been in the 32-35% range).

Guildford Town - West Side

Friary & St Nicolas
Friary & St Nicolas ward elects three councillors.  The Friary bit of this ward covers most of the town centre, stretching slightly to its north.  The St Nicolas bit of the ward is on the other side (the west side) of the River Wey and covers the south west part of the town.

Prior to the 2015 elections all the councillors, since 1983, for Friary & St Nicolas had been Liberal Democrats (or their predecessors).  However the Liberal Democrat majorities had been consistently falling through a number of elections.  In 2003 the Liberal Democrat majority had been 1014, in 2007 it was 553, and in 2011 it fell to 241.  In 2015, the Conservatives took one of the three Liberal Democrats seats on Friary & St Nicolas ward.

Onslow
Onslow include Onslow Village, Guildford Park and the University of Surrey.  The ward elects three councillors.

In the previous eight full council elections in Onslow, half the time three Liberal Democrats had been elected and the other half of the time two Liberal Democrats and one Conservative had been elected.  In 2015, the result in Onslow was, once again, two Liberal Democrats and one Conservative.

The top Labour, Green and Guildford Greenbelt candidates all obtained between 21% and 23% of the vote

The gap between the top Conservative candidate in Onslow and the bottom one was around 14% of the total vote.  The gap between the top Greenbelt candidate and the bottom one was between 9 and 10% of the total vote.  The gap between the top Labour candidate and the bottom one was between 8 and 9% of the total vote; which tends to indicate that there was a lot of voting splitting between the parties, or plumping for just one candidate.

Stoughton
Stoughton is to the north west of Guildford.  It elects three councillors.

Stoughton was one of three wards to the west of Guildford in which a Conservative topped the poll, followed by two Liberal Democrats.  The other two wards were Friary & St Nicolas and Onslow wards.

The Liberal Democrat in third place beat the Conservative in fourth by six votes.  Third gets elected, fourth doesn't.

Westborough
Westborough ward includes Westborough and Park Barn.  Park Barn was largely built as a council estate.  Westborough ward elects three councillors.

Throughout most of its history, as a council ward, Labour have held all three of the Westborough council seats.

Westborough became a ward on Guildford Municipal Borough Council in 1933, as the boundaries of the town were extended to the west around that time, necessitating a new ward in that area.  Between 1933 and 2014, the Conservatives won only once in Westborough ward, in 1968, a year where Labour did very poorly in local elections throughout England and the Conservative gained a lot of their seats as a result.

In 2015 the Conservatives gained two of the three seats on Westborough ward, one at the expense of Labour and one at the expense of the Liberal Democrats.  Existing Liberal Democrat councillor Julia McShane was the other person elected.

Guildford Town - East Side

Burpham
Burpham is towards the north west of the town of Guildford.  It elects two councillors.

In the previous three local elections in Burpham (2003, 2007 and 2011), the ward had been a Conservative - Liberal Democrat marginal, where the largest majority had been 137.  In 2015, Conservatives Christian Holliday and Mike Piper increased their majority over the top Liberal Democrat candidate, in third place, to 689 votes.

Christchurch
Christchurch ward covers the area east of Guildford from Cross Lanes in the west to Boxgrove Park and Abbotswood in the east.  The ward elects two councillors.

Conservatives Matt Furniss and Nikki Nelson-Smith were re-elected with respectively 67.7% and 56.8% of the vote.  The top Liberal Democrat, in third place, won 18.2% of the vote.

Holy Trinity
Holy Trinity ward include most of the south part of the town on the east side of the River Wey.

Three new Conservatives candidates were elected to represent Holy Trinity ward in 2015.  Their majority over the Liberal Democrat in fourth increasing from the 145 majority the Conservatives obtained in 2011, to 438 in 2015.

Merrow
Merrow elects three councillors.

Other than a period in the 1990s when the Liberal Democrats captured Merrow & Burpham, this has been a safe Conservative ward since the mid 1950s.  The Conservative majority over the top placed Liberal Democrat grew from 855 in 2011, to 1348 in 2015.

Stoke
Stoke ward largely consists of Bellfields and Slyfield Green.  Much of Bellfields was originally built as a council estate.

Historically Stoke ward, along with Westborough ward, have been the wards in Guildford most likely to vote Labour.  In 2011 Stoke ward had a close result which saw one Labour and one Liberal Democrat elected, with the top Conservative 35 votes off second place.  In 2015, longstanding Labour councillor Angela Gunning was re-elected.  Also elected was Conservative William Chesterfield; who became the first Conservative to be elected for Stoke ward since 1969.

East Rural Guildford

Clandon & Horsley
Clandon & Horsley elects three councillors.  It is traditionally the Conservatives safest ward on Guildford Borough Council.  2015 saw two Conservatives and one Greenbelt candidate elected in Clandon & Horsley ward.  There was a 40% swing from the Conservatives to the Greenbelt candidates in Clandon & Horsley ward.

Effingham
Effingham is the most easterly of the wards in Guildford Borough.  It elects one councillor.

Liberal Democrat Liz Hogger saw her vote increase form 54.7% in 2011 to 60.5% in 2015.  In both 2011 and 2015, Liz Hogger got the highest percentage vote of any Liberal Democrat candidate for Guildford Borough Council.

Lovelace
Lovelace consists of the villages of Ripley, Ockham and Wisley.  It elects one councillor.

2014, Liberal Democrat, by election winner Colin Cross retained the seat with a 432 majority over the Guildford Greenbelt candidate in second.  The Conservatives were pushed into third.  Lovelace was the only ward in Guildford where the Conservatives did not finish in the top two political parties in 2015.

Send
Send elects two councillors.  Two Guildford Greenbelt candidates topped the poll with a 242 majority over the Conservative in third place.  As in Clandon & Horsley ward, there was a 40% swing from the Conservatives to the Greenbelt candidates in Send.

There are twenty two wards on Guildford Borough Council.   36.2% of the votes which the Greenbelt Group got throughout Guildford Borough in 2015 came from just one ward - Clandon & Horsley.  A further 13.2% of the Greenbelt's Guildford vote, in 2015, came from Send ward.

Tillingbourne
Tillingbourne includes Shere, Albury and St Martha's.  Conservatives Richard Billington and David Wright were re-elected with a 799 majority over the Greenbelt candidate in third place.

Ward by ward

By-Elections
A by-election was held on 5 May 2016 in Stoke ward following the resignation of William Chesterfield.

See also
 Guildford Council election, full results, 2011

References

2015 English local elections
May 2015 events in the United Kingdom
2015
2010s in Surrey